"Smile" is the debut single of American singer Vitamin C. It features vocals from Jamaican reggae singer Lady Saw. "Smile" was the first single released from Vitamin C's self-titled debut album on June 8, 1999. Using television exposure as a major form of promotion, the song became a top-40 hit in Canada, Iceland, New Zealand, and the United States.

Background and release
According to Vitamin C, she had trouble coming up with the song's lyrics. On the day she wrote them, she was feeling sad about the breakup of her former band, Eve's Plum, and decided that she needed to write a happy song to move past her depression. Elektra Records released "Smile" as a 12-inch single on June 8, 1999, and as a CD, maxi-CD, and cassette single on June 29 of the same year. On June 22, 1999, Elektra Records serviced "Smile" to American pop and rhythmic radio stations.

Commercial performance
"Smile" became Vitamin C's highest-charting single in the United States to date, peaking at number 21 on the Billboard Mainstream Top 40 and number 18 on the Billboard Hot 100, becoming her only single to reach the top 20 and her first single to reach the top 40. Worldwide, "Smile" peaked at number 13 in New Zealand, number 24 in Iceland, and number 29 in Canada. The single went Gold in the US, as certified by the Recording Industry Association of America for shipments in excess of 500,000. Billboard attributed the song's success to its intense promotion via television, including featuring in advertisements for The WB series Movie Stars, promos for the NBC series Cold Feet, and the season 9 finale of Beverly Hills, 90210.

Music video
The music video takes place in a multi-colored Sam Goody CD store which has several motifs from the album art. Lady Saw plays a DJ in the video, while Vitamin C dances with a few backup dancers to the song ("Smile") that Lady Saw is playing. The video was directed by Christopher Erskin.

Track listings

US CD single
 "Smile" (album version)
 "Smile" (Maserati mix)
 "Smile" (video)

US maxi-CD single
 "Smile" (Mr. Mig's extended mix)
 "Smile" (radio edit)
 "Smile" (dub mix)
 "Smile" (Maserati mix)
 "Smile" (acapella)
 "Smile" (album version)
 "Smile" (video)

US 12-inch single
A1. "Smile" (Mr. Mig's extended mix)
A2. "Smile" (radio edit)
B1. "Smile" (dub mix)
B2. "Smile" (Maserati mix)
B3. "Smile" (acapella) 

US cassette single
 "Smile"
 "Smile" (Maserati mix)

UK CD single
 "Smile" (radio edit) – 3:24
 "Smile" (rapless edit) – 3:34
 "Smile" (Maserati mix) – 4:03

European CD single
 "Smile" (radio edit) – 3:24
 "Smile" (album version) – 3:57

European maxi-CD single
 "Smile" (radio edit) – 3:24
 "Smile" (Mr. Mig's club mix) – 3:47
 "Smile" (rapless edit) – 3:34
 "Smile" (Maserati mix) – 4:03

Australian CD single
 "Smile" (radio edit)
 "Smile" (Maserati mix)
 "Smile" (Mr. Mig's club mix)
 "Smile" (LP version)
 "Smile" (rapless edit)
 "Smile" (video)

Credits and personnel
Credits are lifted from the US CD single and Vitamin C liner notes.

Studios
 Recorded at Axis Studios (New York City)
 Mixed at Quad Recording Studios and Avatar Studios (New York City)
 Mastered at Sterling Sound (New York City)

Personnel

 Vitamin C – writing (as Colleen Fitzpatrick)
 Josh Deutsch – writing, production
 Garry Hughes – production
 Lloyd Puckitt – recording
 Michael Patterson – mixing
 Ann Mincieli – mixing assistance (Quad)
 Greg Gasperino – mixing assistance (Avatar)

Charts

Certifications

References

1999 debut singles
1999 songs
Elektra Records singles
Lady Saw songs
Songs written by Vitamin C (singer)
Vitamin C (singer) songs